Aue-Bad Schlema is a town and a municipality in the Erzgebirgskreis, in Saxony, Germany. It was created with effect from 1 January 2019 by the merger of the former municipalities of Aue and Bad Schlema.

Twin towns – sister cities

Aue-Bad Schlema is twinned with:
 Solingen, Germany (1990)
 Kadaň, Czech Republic (2003)
 Guingamp, France (2011)

References

Erzgebirgskreis